Masjid Malcolm Shabazz, formerly known as Mosque No. 7, is a Sunni Muslim mosque in Harlem, New York City. It was formerly a Nation of Islam mosque at which Malcolm X preached, until he left it for Sunni Islam in 1964.

History
Opened as Temple No. 7 of the Nation of Islam (NOI) at the Harlem YMCA in 1946 (all Nation of Islam sites were initially called Temples; the NOI switched to the term mosque as a move to add to the Nation's legitimacy by adding elements from mainstream Islam), it was moved to Lenox Casino at 102 West 116th Street on the southwest corner of Lenox Avenue and it "was just a storefront in 1954 when Malcolm was named minister by Elijah Muhammad." When Malcolm X split from Elijah Muhammad in 1964, he started a Sunni Muslim mosque named The Muslim Mosque Inc.  The successor to that mosque is The Mosque of Islamic Brotherhood Inc. at 130 West 113th Street, in Harlem.

In January 1964, Elijah Muhammad stripped Malcolm of his offices. Muhammad promoted James 3X as the new minister of Mosque No. 7.

Temple No. 7 was destroyed in a bombing in 1965, after Malcolm X's assassination, which forced the Nation of Islam to move the mosque to 106 West 127th Street. The building was redesigned by Sabbath Brown, and in 1976 the mosque was renamed Malcolm Shabazz Mosque, (by Wallace D. Muhammad, the new leader of the Nation of Islam), or Masjid Malcolm Shabazz, to honor the memory and contributions of Malcolm X.

In 1972, the mosque was the location of a controversial police shooting. 

At 19 years of age in 1984, Conrad Tillard converted to Islam, joined the Nation of Islam, and became known as Conrad X, and later as Conrad Muhammad. At 25 years of age he was appointed the Minister of Mosque No. 7, and The Boston Globe described him as the heir-apparent of NOI head Louis Farrakhan.

See also

  List of mosques in the Americas
  Lists of mosques 
  List of mosques in the United States

References

External links

Harlem
Former Nation of Islam mosques
Malcolm X
Mosques in New York City
20th-century mosques
Mosques completed in 1946
Mosque buildings with domes
1946 establishments in New York City
Sunni mosques in the United States